Mithari is a river in Pali district originates from confluence of many small nallahs from south-western slopes of Aravalli Range in Pali district. It vanishes in Jalore district near Sankhwali village. Bali and Falna comes in its basin. Its catchment area is about 1,644 km2, in Pali and Jalore districts.

Temple Nimbeshwar is on the bank of Mithri river.

External links
 Luni tributaries (Department of Irrigation, Government of Rajasthan)

Reference
 

Pali district
Jalore district
Rivers of Rajasthan
Rivers of India